The Jacksonville Commercial Historic District encompasses a 1-1/2 block section of 1st Street in Jacksonville, Arkansas, between Main Street and 2nd Street.  The area contains six commercial buildings, constructed between 1925 and 1962, a period when the railroad was an important element of the city's growth.  (The railroad tracks lie across 1st Street from the commercial strip.  The buildings are mostly single-story brick or stucco buildings with vernacular style.

The district was listed on the National Register of Historic Places in 2016.

See also
National Register of Historic Places listings in Pulaski County, Arkansas

References

Historic districts on the National Register of Historic Places in Arkansas
Jacksonville, Arkansas
National Register of Historic Places in Pulaski County, Arkansas